300 "Samasi" Aragveli ("300 Aragvians") is a station of the Tbilisi Metro on the Akhmeteli–Varketili Line. It is named after 300 soldiers from the Aragvi valley who died defending Tbilisi against the Persian army, at the battle of Krtsanisi in 1795.

External links
 300 Aragvelians station page at Tbilisi Municipal Portal

Tbilisi Metro stations
Railway stations opened in 1967
1967 establishments in Georgia (country)